Yuhanna al-Armani al-Qudsi (cca 1720 - 1786, Cairo, Ottoman Empire) was an artist of Armenian origin in Ottoman Egypt. He is most notable for his religious works, especially his Coptic icons that decorate The Hanging Church in Old Cairo.

Yuhanna seemed to be an ordinary person, who had gained a certain status through his hard work. He was not very rich, but it could be said that he enjoyed a certain comfort. In addition to creating icons for churches, he also created works for individual patrons. It had a position like other artisans who lived in Cairo or any other Ottoman city.

References

1720 births
1786 deaths
Artists from Cairo
Ethnic Armenian painters
Egyptian painters
18th-century painters from the Ottoman Empire
Egyptian people of Armenian descent
Armenians from the Ottoman Empire
18th-century Egyptian people